Dionysia-Theodora Avgerinopoulou (Greek: Διονυσία-Θεοδώρα Αυγερινοπούλου, born 10 September 1975) is a politician regarding environmental matters, a specialized attorney in International, Environmental and Sustainable Development Law, and the recipient of the Green Star Award awarded by UNEP, OCHA, and Green Cross International for her leadership in prevention, preparedness and response to environmental emergencies.

Avgerinopoulou served as a Member of the Hellenic Parliament from 2009 to 2014. She has served as the Deputy Secretary of Volunteer and NGOs for the New Democracy (Greece) Party and Deputy Head of Environmental Policy Sector. During her tenure, she was elected three times as the Chairperson of the Special Permanent Parliamentary Committee on Environmental Protection and the Subcommittee of the Water Resources. She also held the position of the Chair of the Standing Permanent Parliamentary Committee on National Defense and Foreign Affairs.

Early life
She was born in Patras, Achaea, Greece, and grew up in Zacharo, a town close to Ancient Olympia in Southwestern Greece, in Elis. 
She holds a "Ptyhio" (LL.B. equivalent) from the Law Faculty of the National and Kapodistrian University of Athens and a Master of Laws (LL.M.) in International Legal Studies, with distinction from the Georgetown University Law Center in Washington, D.C. and a J.S.D. (Ph.D. in law) in International Environmental Law from Columbia University Law School in New York, N.Y.

Career
Avgerinopoulou is a specialized attorney in International and Environmental Law and she has dealt with major environmental cases in both the domestic jurisdiction and at the Legal
Service of the European Commission in Brussels, Belgium. As an international attorney, Avgerinopoulou also specializes in international investment projects (project management and project finance) of environmental and energy enterprises, where she holds a successful track record. Avgerinopoulou has worked as a researcher at the Yale Center for Environmental Law and Policy on legal and policy research on Global Environmental Governance issues, the Yale Law School on International Environmental Law issues, good governance and corruption, and the Center for Environmental and Land Use Law of the New York University School of Law.. In March 2010, Avgerinopoulou was assigned Deputy Secretary of Volunteerism and NGOs for the New Democracy Party and held this position until January 2011, when she was appointed as the Deputy Head of the Environmental Policy Sector of the New Democracy Party.

Avgerinopoulou has served as Member of the Hellenic Parliament and represents the Prefecture of Elis (Ilia), while from 2009 to 2011 she was a Member of the Hellenic Parliament "at large" (Constituency: State, in Greek: "βουλευτής Επικρατείας".) Avgerinopoulou has served as the Chairperson of the Special Permanent Committee for Environmental Protection and the Subcommittee of the Water Resources of the Hellenic Parliament, as well as the National Defense and Foreign Affairs Committee. During her tenure,
Dionysia-Theodora focused on the financing of sustainable development; the efficient waste management and the development of a circular economy; the empowerment of the enforcement mechanisms of Environmental Law; the support of innovative technologies, including space technologies, for the protection of the natural environment; the promotion of renewable energy sources; the mitigation and adaptation of climate change and the support of technologies of  capture, storage, conversion and reuse; the nexus between environment, agriculture, and food; the nexus between environment and public health, and the sound management of water resources. She also led deliberations on the ratification of major multilateral agreements before the Parliament, while she represented the Parliament at major international environmental conferences, including UNEA -1 and COP 19 of the UNFCCC.

In 2015, Avgerinopoulou was elected at the Steering Committee of the Global Water Partnership Organization (GWPO) in recognition of her previous successful leadership in water issues, as well as her experience to co-operate with international, regional and national arrangements in sustainable water management, in order to create solutions to water issues at all levels and also opportunities for sustainable development. Avgerinopoulou also serves as a Member of the Audit and Finance Subcommittee of the GWPO, while her vision within the Organization is the promotion and realization of  Sustainable Development Goals No 6 and 14.

In 2014, she was elected as the Chairperson of the United Nations Affairs Committee of the Inter-Parliamentary Union (IPU), due to her extensive knowledge of the UN System, acquired throughout her doctoral studies and her previous parliamentary and professional engagements. In this position, Avgerinopoulou participated
in high level meetings at the UN, including meetings with the UN Secretary-General and the Head of the Parliaments, while she cc-presided meetings on behalf of the IPU with the participation of the UN Deputy Secretary-General. Avgerinopoulou represented the IPU in many topics of the UN Agenda and was an advocate for the Sustainable Development Goals (SDGs). Avgerinopoulou is also promoting the SDGs through various others institutions and network, first and foremost through the special Task Force on the SDGs of the Young Global Leaders of the World Economic Forum. She has also previously worked as an advisor at the European Union Delegation to the United Nations in New York, dealing mainly with the environment and sustainable development agendas.

In 2012, she was elected as the Chairperson of the Circle of the Mediterranean Parliamentarians on Sustainable Development (COMPSUD). Leading a dynamic network of Parliamentarians, members of the Environment Committees of twenty-six countries around the Mediterranean Sea, Avgerinopoulou put a special emphasis on efforts for the de-pollution of the Mediterranean, the combat against marine litter, and especially micro-plastics; she actively participated in dialogues for the destruction of the chemical weapons of Syria, while she tackled issues of climate change adaptation, with an emphasis on the vulnerable coastal and forest areas. Along with the MedPartnership, UNEP/MAP, the GWP and Horizon2020 projects, COMPSUD furthers the goals of the Integrated Coastal Zone Management (ICZM) and the Integrated Water Resources Management (IWRM).

In 2011, Avgerinopoulou was appointed as the Deputy Head of the Environmental Policy Sector ("Shadow" Deputy Minister for the Environment) of the New Democracy Party in Greece.

As the Deputy Head, she substantially contributed to the strategic planning of the Party regarding environmental policies by following a large-scale systems and holistic approach. She led the deliberations of environmental bills in the Parliament on behalf of the Party. She also led initiatives and campaigns, with a special emphasis on environmental education and volunteerism. She also served as the Deputy Secretary of Volunteerism and NGOs, where she worked closely with civil society representatives on a country level in various initiatives.

She is a co-founder and executive director of the European Institute of Law, Science & Technology (EILST), a European non-governmental organization (NGO) aiming at building bridges between legal experts and scientists in the fields of environment, energy,
telecommunications, space, biosciences, and intellectual property. Apart from
the supervision of the "knowledge management" function of the institute, Avgerinopoulou effectively manages the Institute assuming overall responsibility for its functioning, while she sets the policy guidelines, oversees the project management functions of the institute, and coordinates environmental and renewable resources projects with local authorities (Regions). Further, she belongs to the Young Global Leaders of the World Economic Forum, as well as to the 40 Under 40 Young European Leaders of the EU under the age of 40.

Education 
Avgerinopoulou received a first degree in law (LL.B.) from the Faculty of Law of the National and Kapodistrian University of Athens, Greece, with distinction, and an LL.M. in International Legal Studies from the Georgetown University Law Center in Washington, D.C., with distinction. She also holds a Doctorate in Juridical Science (J.S.D.) with specialization in International Environmental Law and International Institutions from the Columbia University School of Law in New York, NY.

During her studies, Avgerinopoulou has been the recipient of many awards and scholarships, most
notably including a Fulbright scholarship, an Alexander S. Onassis scholarship, and a NATO scholarship. She has also extensively taught and published in the fields of Public International Law, European Union Law and Environmental Law.

She speaks Greek, English, French and German.

Social contribution and awards 
Avgerinopoulou has devoted an important part of her pro bono work to humanitarian and
environmental goals, including the prevention of anthropogenic and natural disasters, the post-disaster management, and relief and reconstruction efforts. She took leadership in the reconstruction of the Southwestern Peloponnese, Greece, after the wildfires in 2007 and generated international assistance for the region by other countries. Avgerinopoulou has also been active in a series in relief and reconstruction efforts after the occurrence of disasters
worldwide, such as after the earthquake in, the wildfires in Haifa, Israel, and the nuclear accident in Fukushima, Japan.

In recognition of her efforts, she was presented with the "Global Citizenship Award for Leadership in Assisting Humanity" by "Orphans International Worldwide" in 2010, while in 2011, she received the "Green Star" Award by UNEP/OCHA and Green Cross International.

Avgerinopoulou has been selected as a Young Global Leader of the World Economic Forum (WEF), under which she participates in various task forces, including the Task Force on Decarbonization, in order to combat climate change, and the Task Force for the Sustainable Development Goals. She has also been elected as one of the "40 Under 40" of the EU, namely among the forty most promising leaders of the European Union under the age of 40.

In 2010, she received a U.S. Special Congressional Recognition for her "outstanding efforts and invaluable contributions on behalf of Hellenic Students and the environment" by the She has been the recipient of the international "Goddess Artemis Award" by the Euro-American Women's Council for her contribution to transatlantic cooperation between the and the EU institutions on environmental and climate change issues. She has also been among the candidates for the "Women of Europe Award". She has been voted as the first alternative nominee for the United Nations Hamilton Shirley Amerasinghe Memorial Fellowship on the Law of the Sea.

Avgerinopoulou is an active member of many civil society and academic organizations, such as the Network of Women Ministers and Leaders for the Environment, the Hellenic Association for Environmental Law, the Climate Parliament, the Biopolitics International Organization, the Academic Council on the United Nations System and the American Society of International Law.

References

External links
 Official site
 Official Blogspot

1975 births
Living people
Georgetown University Law Center alumni
Columbia Law School alumni
Greek MPs 2009–2012
People from Elis
Greek MPs 2012 (May)
Greek MPs 2012–2014
New Democracy (Greece) politicians
Politicians from Elis
21st-century Greek politicians
21st-century Greek women politicians
Greek MPs 2019–2023